Aaron Goldsmith (born August 29, 1983, in Wichita, Kansas) is an American sportscaster.

Goldsmith does some of the lead play-by-play on selected games for Root Sports Northwest during the Mariners baseball season. Goldsmith also does selected baseball games, primarily on selected Saturdays for Fox Sports 1. In the off-season, he also provides play-by-play for college football on Sports USA Radio Network and Pac-12 basketball on Fox Sports 1.

Early years
Goldsmith spent the early part of his childhood in Wichita, Kansas. He was a Royals fan. He attended his first game at Kauffman Stadium and it was stated that Bo Jackson, George Brett, and Bret Saberhagen were some of his favorite players as a child. When his family moved to St. Louis, Goldsmith became a Cardinals fan. Goldsmith has stated that legendary Cardinals announcer Jack Buck was a big influence to him and that he meant just as much to St. Louis as legendary Mariners announcer Dave Niehaus meant to Seattle.

When Goldsmith was attending Principia College in Illinois working on a degree in history, he said that he woke up one morning, thinking that sportscasting might be a fun career. After graduating from Principia with his history degree, Goldsmith began taking classes at the Broadcast Center in St. Louis. Due to his history background, Goldsmith often found he was four years behind other students. It took 10 months for Goldsmith to graduate from The Broadcast Center.

Career
Upon graduation, Goldsmith began play-by-play broadcasting as an intern for Gateway Grizzlies games. The year was 2007, and Goldsmith would provide 2-innings of play-by-play for each home game. Goldsmith would follow this up with an unpaid internship with the Bourne Braves and then a similar position with the Portland Sea Dogs. In all cases, Goldsmith would be allowed to call select games or innings. During these stints, Goldsmith often found himself starving after calling games and realized he didn't even have a dollar to his name.

After a brief time with the Sea Dogs, Goldsmith worked as the play-by-play voice for the Frisco RoughRiders. He would also serve as the team's manager of broadcasting and public relations. Goldsmith would remain with the RoughRiders for two seasons. During his time with the RoughRiders, Goldsmith proposed to his wife, Heather, and she accepted.

In 2012, Goldsmith was hired to be the play-by-play voice for the Pawsox Radio Network. Goldsmith would provide play-by-play for every game that season, a first for himself. Goldsmith admits he joined the PawSox because of their history to produce big name announcers, but he knew that was no guarantee.

Finally in 2013, Goldsmith joined the Mariners announcing team alongside Rick Rizzs. Goldsmith and his family now live in the Seattle suburb of Kirkland. Goldsmith's play-by-play style is often attributed to an adaptation of Vin Scully, but Goldsmith attributes his style to his work with Eric Nadel and Dave O'Brien. On December 26, 2021, he was a last minute substitution for Gus Johnson teaming with Aqib Talib for an NFL on FOX game in Seattle between the Chicago Bears and the Seattle Seahawks. Goldsmith has yet to win the Washington State Sportscaster of the Year award, three times losing out to famed Mariners Broadcaster Dave Sims. In January 2023 Goldsmith elected to remain with the Mariners after being the St. Louis Cardinals' top candidate for their lead TV job. During a 2023 Spring Training interview Goldsmith's broadcast partner Gary Hill revealed that Goldsmith plans to debut the catchphrase "How do you do?!" for big calls during the season.

References

External links
Seattle Mariners – Broadcasters

1983 births
Living people
American radio personalities
American sports announcers
College basketball announcers in the United States
College football announcers
Major League Baseball broadcasters
Minor League Baseball broadcasters
National Football League announcers
Principia College alumni
Seattle Mariners announcers
Radio personalities from St. Louis
Women's college basketball announcers in the United States